Gerhard Boldt (24 January 1918 – 10 May 1981) was an officer in the German Army (Heer) who wrote about his experiences during World War II.

World War II service
On 4 August 1943, Boldt was awarded a Knight's Cross of the Iron Cross for extreme bravery.  He was a senior-lieutenant (Oberleutnant) with the 58th Infantry Division on the Eastern Front.  Boldt also served as a cavalry officer.

Berlin 1945
During the last months of World War II, Boldt was seconded to Reinhard Gehlen's military intelligence staff.  He was stationed in German dictator Adolf Hitler's Führerbunker.  It was located below the Reich Chancellery in central Berlin.  Boldt reported to General Hans Krebs and was summoned to a daily briefing session with Hitler, his generals, and closest associates - in particular Martin Bormann, Hermann Göring, and Joseph Goebbels.  Boldt had a unique opportunity to observe at close quarters the leading members of the Nazi hierarchy during the Battle of Berlin.  After the war, he wrote about his experiences during the last days in Nazi-held Berlin.  Boldt's description of the atmosphere, first in the semi-ruined Reich Chancellery and then in the claustrophobic surroundings of the Führerbunker, convey a chilling impression of destruction and of the collapse of the entire Nazi system.

Background
By 21 April 1945, Soviet Marshal Georgi Zhukov's 1st Belorussian Front had broken through the defenses of German General Gotthard Heinrici's Army Group Vistula on the Seelow Heights.  Having achieved the breakthrough, the Soviets were advancing towards Berlin with little to stop them. Adolf Hitler, ignoring the facts, saw salvation in the ragtag units commanded by General Felix Steiner.  Steiner's command became known as "Army Detachment Steiner" (Armeeabteilung Steiner). Army Detachment Steiner was an army that existed primarily on paper: it was something more than a corps but less than an army. Hitler ordered Steiner to attack the northern flank of the huge salient created by Zhukov's breakthrough; and the German Ninth Army, commanded by General Theodor Busse, which had been pushed to the south of the salient, was ordered to attack northward in a pincer movement.

Late on 21 April, Heinrici called Hans Krebs, chief of the German General Staff (OKH), and told him that Hitler's plan could not be implemented.  Heinrici asked to speak to Hitler but was told by Krebs that Hitler was too busy to take his call.

Army Detachment Steiner fails to launch an attack
Of 22 April, Boldt wrote the following concerning Hitler's breakdown during one of his last conferences:

Almost immediately after Hitler's plan for Steiner failed to launch, a new plan was created.  The new plan involved General Walther Wenck and his Twelfth Army.  Wenck's army faced the Americans to the west.  The new plan had Wenck attack with his army to the east, link up with the Ninth Army of General Theodor Busse, and relieve Berlin.

Of 25 to 26 April, Boldt wrote the following about Hitler's order to flood the underground railway:

Last days in the Führerbunker
Of 28 April, Boldt documented the following discussions between Martin Bormann, Hans Krebs, and Wilhelm Burgdorf:

Early on 29 April, Freytag-Loringhoven informed Boldt that Hitler had married Eva Braun.  Boldt was laughing at the news when Krebs came from behind a curtain and chastised him:  "Have you gone quite mad?  How dare you laugh at your highest commander?"

Escape
On 29 April, communications were down, the Soviets were closing in, and many were morbidly anticipating Hitler's suicide and wondering what the future held. Boldt's friend, Bernd von Freytag-Loringhoven, had obtained permission for them to leave. That evening, Boldt left the Führerbunker with von Freytag-Loringhoven and Burgdorf's assistant, Lieutenant-Colonel Rudolf Weiss. The men had been tasked with trying to reach General Walther Wenck's Twelfth Army, and requesting relief for Berlin.  Weiss became separated from his two companions and was captured. He endured five years of captivity in a Soviet POW camp in Poland. At night when Boldt and von Freytag-Loringhoven were hiding in a ditch in a forest, Boldt attempted to commit suicide by taking an overdose of morphine. Von Freytag-Loringhoven forced him to regorge the morphine and thus saved his life.  On 12 May, after several close encounters with Soviet troops, the two other men parted company; Boldt going north to Lubeck and von Loringhoven heading towards Leipzig to join his wife and son. Boldt reached his family in Lubeck. There he was arrested by British troops and sent to an internment camp.

Post-war
Boldt became a writer.  He wrote Hitler's Last Days: An Eye-Witness Account. This book was translated by Sandra Bance and was used for the films Hitler: The Last Ten Days (1973) and Downfall (2004; Der Untergang). He committed suicide on 7 May 1981.

Controversy
It has been claimed that Boldt may not have been present in the Führerbunker during Hitler's last days. One writer, Mayo Mohs reported in Time magazine, that Boldt "constructs Hitler's very last days from already published sources—since he was not there." Other sources, however, do reference Boldt having been in the Führerbunker.

Awards
Iron Cross (1939)
2nd Class
1st Class
Knight's Cross of the Iron Cross as Oberleutnant in Aufklärungs-Abteilung 158

See also
 Bibliography of Adolf Hitler

References

Citations

Bibliography
 
 
 Dollinger, Hans. The Decline and Fall of Nazi Germany and Imperial Japan, Library of Congress Catalogue Card Number 67-27047
 
 
 
 

1918 births
1981 deaths
German Army officers of World War II
German military writers
German non-fiction writers
Recipients of the Knight's Cross of the Iron Cross
German male non-fiction writers
20th-century non-fiction writers
Military personnel from Lübeck